The Abraham Best House is a historic house located at 113 Vischer Ferry Road near Vischer Ferry, Saratoga County, New York.

Description and history 
It was built in about 1815 by Abraham and Harriet Best of Claverack, Columbia County, and is a two-story, five-bay wide, Federal style brick dwelling. It has a -story rear kitchen ell. The house sits on a limestone foundation and the front block has a side gable roof and interior end chimneys. The house was renovated in the 1940s. The front facade features a Palladian window on the second floor over the main entry. Also on the property is a contributing barn (c. 1900).

It was listed on the National Register of Historic Places on July 14, 2011.

References

Houses on the National Register of Historic Places in New York (state)
Federal architecture in New York (state)
Houses completed in 1815
Houses in Saratoga County, New York
National Register of Historic Places in Saratoga County, New York